Ismet Sejfić  (born September 7, 1993) is a Bosnian professional basketball player Golden Eagle Ylli of the Kosovo Basketball Superleague. Also, he represents Bosnia and Herzegovina national basketball team.

Playing career 
In the 2016–17 season, he played for PVSK Panthers and averaged 16.9 points and 8.0 rebounds. He spent the 2015-16 season with KK Student Mostar in the Basketball Championship of Bosnia and Herzegovina after spending the previous season with BC Dzūkija in the Lithuanian Basketball League. In August 2021, he signed for Podgorica.

References

External links 
Ismet Sejfić at eurobasket.com
Ismet Sejfić at kosarsport.hu

Living people
1993 births
Bosnia and Herzegovina men's basketball players
KK Bosna Royal players
KK Sutjeska players
KK Podgorica players
Centers (basketball)
PVSK Panthers players
People from Prozor-Rama